Akwasi Antwi (born May 9, 1985) is a Canadian football linebacker who is currently a free agent. He was drafted 26th overall by the Calgary Stampeders. Antwi played CIS football with the Mount Allison Mounties.

Professional career

Calgary Stampeders
Antwi was drafted 26th overall (fourth round) by the Calgary Stampeders in the 2011 CFL Draft. He signed with the team on May 25, 2011. He spent two seasons with the Stamps amassing 28 special teams tackles and six regular tackles.

Toronto Argonauts
On April 8, 2013, Antwi was traded to the Toronto Argonauts in exchange for the rights to offensive tackle Daniel Federkeil. He was released by the Argonauts on July 25, 2013.

BC Lions
Antwi was signed as a free agent by the BC Lions on February 27, 2014. He was released by the Lions on May 14, 2015.

Toronto Argonauts
Antwi was signed as a free agent by the Toronto Argonauts on August 6, when he was added to the team's practice roster. Antwi was activated to the active roster on August 8, when he saw his first action with the Argonauts against the Saskatchewan Roughriders.

References

External links
BC Lions profile 

1985 births
Living people
Players of Canadian football from Ontario
Canadian football defensive linemen
Mount Allison Mounties football players
Calgary Stampeders players
Canadian football people from Toronto